The Old Bell Museum is a former 16th-century inn, converted into a museum and run by volunteers from the Montgomery Civic Society of Powys. The half-timbered building contains eleven rooms of various local exhibits, including information on the architecture of the building itself. The building was originally opened as the Old Bell Hotel, and was a temperance hotel fashioned for teetotal visitors visiting Montgomery 

The Old Bell Museum was awarded "Accredited Museum" status by the Museums, Libraries and Archives Council of Wales (MLA) in February 2009 and re-accredited in 2013.

References

External links

 

Commercial buildings completed in the 16th century
Museums in Powys
Historic house museums in Wales
Local museums in Wales
Montgomery, Powys